Brachaspis is a genus of grasshoppers belonging to the family Acrididae.

The species of this genus are found in New Zealand.

Species:

Brachaspis collinus 
Brachaspis nivalis  - type species
Brachaspis robustus

References

Acrididae
Caelifera genera